Aniak Airport  is a state-owned public-use airport located in Aniak, a city in the Bethel Census Area of the U.S. state of Alaska. Its location on the Kuskokwim River also allows for the landing of seaplanes.

As per Federal Aviation Administration records, the airport had 18,526 passenger boardings (enplanements) in calendar year 2008, 16,255 enplanements in 2009, and 16,394 in 2010. It is included in the National Plan of Integrated Airport Systems for 2011–2015, which categorized it as a primary commercial service airport (more than 10,000 enplanements per year).

Facilities and aircraft
Aniak Airport covers an area of 1,722 acres (697 ha) at an elevation of 89 feet (27 m) above mean sea level. It has one asphalt paved runway designated 11/29 (formerly 10/28) which measures 6,000 by 150 feet (1,829 x 46 m). It also has one seaplane landing area designated 5W/23W on an area of water measuring 3,000 by 400 feet (914 x 122 m). There are 19 aircraft based at this airport: 89.5% single-engine and 10.5% multi-engine.

Airlines and destinations

Passenger

The following airlines offer scheduled passenger service at this airport:

Prior to its bankruptcy and cessation of all operations, Ravn Alaska served the airport from multiple locations.

Cargo

Statistics

References

External links
 Topographic map from USGS The National Map
 FAA Alaska airport diagram (GIF)
 

Airports in the Bethel Census Area, Alaska